Nachaba auritalis is a species of snout moth in the genus Nachaba. It is found in Brazil.

References

Moths described in 1859
Chrysauginae